

Sigeferth or Sigefirth or Sicgga, was the third Bishop of Selsey, consecrated in 733 by Tatwine, the Archbishop of Canterbury. Sigeferth was still bishop in 747, when he attended the Synod of Clofesho. His date of death was sometime between 747 and 765.

Citations

References

External links
 

Bishops of Selsey
8th-century English bishops